David Pate and Scott Warner were the defending champions but only Pate competed that year with Scott Davis.

Davis and Pate lost in the second round to John Fitzgerald and Mark Woodforde.

Broderick Dyke and Peter Lundgren won in the final 6–2, 6–4 against Stefan Edberg and Ivan Lendl.

Seeds
All eight seeded teams received byes to the second round.

Draw

Finals

Top half

Bottom half

External links
1990 Australian Indoor Championships Doubles Draw

Doubles